Songs of Faith and Devotion Live is the second live album by English electronic music band Depeche Mode, released on 6 December 1993 by Mute Records. Recorded during the band's 1993 Devotional Tour, the album consists mainly of performances recorded in Liévin, France, with two other tracks recorded in Copenhagen and New Orleans, respectively. It was a track-by-track live duplication of Depeche Mode's eighth studio album, Songs of Faith and Devotion, which was released earlier in 1993.

The album was poorly received by critics and performed moderately on the charts, reaching number 46 on the UK Albums Chart and number 193 on the US Billboard 200. As of April 2006, it had sold 114,000 copies in the United States.

A near-complete concert of the Devotional Tour was released on the Devotional video album in 1993, and attained more commercial success.

Critical reception

In comparison to Songs of Faith and Devotion, Songs and Faith and Devotion Live received less acclaim from music critics; AllMusic rated the album two stars out of five.

The A.V. Club rated Songs of Faith and Devotion Live as the "Least Essential Live Album" of the 1990s, saying, "Depeche Mode has plugged in plenty of DAT and drum machines during its live performances, thereby allowing the band to crank out note-perfect versions of its studio hits. Featuring every track on Songs of Faith And Devotion, played live and in order, the album's live counterpart is monumentally unnecessary." In the same feature, the album was listed as one of ten nominees for "Least Essential Album" of the decade with the comment, "It's not like Depeche Mode is inclined to rely on radical instrumental improvisation live."

Track listing

Notes
 All tracks were recorded live at Stade Couvert Régional in Liévin, France, on 29 July 1993, except "Get Right with Me", recorded at Forum Copenhagen in Copenhagen on 27 May 1993, and "One Caress", recorded at Lakefront Arena in New Orleans on 8 October 1993.

Personnel
Credits adapted from the liner notes of Songs of Faith and Devotion Live.

Depeche Mode
 Alan Wilder
 Martin Gore
 David Gahan
 Andy Fletcher

Additional musicians
 Hildia Campbell – backing vocals
 Samantha Smith – backing vocals

Technical
 Alan Wilder – production, mixing
 Steve Lyon – production, mixing, recording
 Peter Brandt – recording assistance
 Rob Kirwan – mixing assistance
 Alex Firla – mixing assistance
 Jeremy Wheatley – mixing assistance
 Kevin Metcalfe – mastering
 JD Fanger – album coordination
 Daryl Bamonte – album coordination
 Pepe Jansz – album coordination

Artwork
 Anton Corbijn – visuals, art direction, sleeve design
 Area – sleeve design

Charts

References

External links
 Album information from the official Depeche Mode website

1993 live albums
Depeche Mode live albums
Mute Records live albums

es:Songs of Faith and Devotion#Edición en concierto